Edward Scott Lampert (born July 19, 1962) is an American billionaire businessman. He is the former CEO and chairman of Sears Holdings (SHLD); founder of Transform Holdco LLC; and founder, chairman, and CEO of ESL Investments. Until May 2007, he was a director of AutoNation. He was a director of AutoZone from 1999 to 2006. As of October 2021, his net worth was estimated at US$2 billion.

Early life and education
Lampert was born in 1962 to Dolores Lampert and Floyd M. Lampert. He is Jewish. His mother was a housewife. His father was a senior partner in the law firm of Lampert & Lampert in New York City. He has a younger sister Tracey. Lampert's grandmother was a passive investor and a fan of Louis Rukeyser's Wall Street Week television program. She instilled in him an interest in investing. His mother would later recall that young Eddie would sit with his grandmother reviewing and evaluating the performance of her stock picks in the daily newspaper.

Lampert's father died in 1977, and his mother took a job as a clerk at Saks Fifth Avenue. His mother would later say: "Eddie really assumed the responsibility, knowing that life had changed and we had to accomplish something by ourselves now." In order to help support his family, Lampert worked after school and on weekends at various warehouses, stocking shelves and filling orders. Despite working, he earned good grades, played both soccer and basketball, and won the scholar athlete award at his high school. He received financial aid to help pay for college. Lampert graduated from Yale University in 1984 with a bachelor's degree in economics, summa cum laude, where he was a member of Skull and Bones and Phi Beta Kappa.

Career
In July 1984, Lampert worked as an intern at Goldman Sachs, and then worked in the firm's risk arbitrage department from March 1985 to February 1988.  While there, he worked directly with Robert Rubin. When Lampert decided to go out on his own, Rubin warned him it would be a bad career decision.

In April 1988, Lampert left the bank to form ESL Investments, based in Greenwich, Connecticut (the name ESL derives from Lampert's initials). Richard Rainwater, whom Lampert had met on Nantucket Island, gave him $28 million in seed money and introduced him to clients, such as David Geffen.

Lampert typically holds his investments for several years and usually has between three and fifteen stocks in his portfolio. His investment style has drawn comparisons to the financier Warren Buffett.

Lampert's earnings in 2004 were estimated to be $1.02 billion, making him the first Wall Street financial manager to exceed an income of $1 billion in a single year. In 2006, Lampert was featured on the Time 100 list for most influential people in the world for being one of the "brightest minds on Wall Street" and leading a new class of activist hedge funds. Lampert was the richest person in Connecticut in 2006 with a net worth of $3.8 billion.

In March 2012, Lampert was No. 367 on the Forbes world wealthiest people list with a net worth of $3.1 billion. By August, 2016, Lampert had fallen to No. 810 on the list, with a net worth of $2.2 billion.

In January 2013, it was announced that Lampert would take over as chief executive officer at Sears after Louis D'Ambrosio stepped down due to family health matters, which took effect in May 2013. In July 2016 he held 28% of shares in Sears Holdings Corp worth approximately $408 million.

In early 2017, Lampert, then president, chief executive officer and top shareholder of Sears Holdings, was estimated to have personal assets of $2 billion, primarily in the hedge fund ESL Investments Inc. Early in the year, he committed to providing an additional loan of $500 million to Sears and said he would provide letters of credit to Sears for additional amounts, reportedly totaling $200 million and possibly increasing to a half billion dollars in the future.

He has been criticized by employees and corporate staff for "shredding" his employees in corporate meetings and "being out of touch with reality," as well as for failing to invest in the physical stores, as many of them are deteriorating. During his tenure as CEO, Sears lost around half its value within five years, and closed more than half of its physical stores.

On October 15, 2018, Lampert stepped down as CEO of Sears Holdings, while remaining chairman of the board, as part of Sears Holdings bankruptcy actions. On December 6, 2018, Lampert, through his company ESL Investments, offered to buy all of Sears for $4.6 billion in cash and stock. The offer would be financed by $950 million in added debt, but no additional cash. In early 2019, five hundred stores remained in operation; the remainder were in liquidation. According to a company filing, Lampert stepped down as chairman of Sears Holdings Corp on February 14, 2019.

In January 2019, a group of Sears' creditors hoping to persuade a federal judge to force Sears to liquidate alleged that Lampert had orchestrated a "multiyear and multifaceted scheme" to strip away the company's assets and benefit from its decline. In May 2019, Lampert, months after purchasing the remains of Sears from the holding company, threatened not to pay out the $43 million in pension payments owed to 90,000 former Sears and Kmart employees and retirees.

Personal life
In 2001, Lampert married Kinga Keh, an attorney with whom he has three children. They own houses in Indian Creek Village, Florida, and Greenwich, Connecticut. The couple are active members of their local Chabad house.

Lampert is the owner of the Fountainhead, an  motor luxury yacht.

In 2003, Lampert was kidnapped from the parking lot of his Greenwich office, but persuaded his captors to let him go after two days of captivity by promising to pay them a ransom.

Lampert is a self-proclaimed supporter of free market economics and is a fan of libertarian writer Ayn Rand.

References

External links
 SHC Speaks Sears Holdings' corporate blog.
 SHC: Chairman's Messages to Shareholders  (Previous years)
 
 
 

1962 births
American billionaires
American financiers
20th-century American Jews
American investors
American financial analysts
Goldman Sachs people
American hedge fund managers
Sears Holdings people
Kidnapped American people
Kidnapped businesspeople
Living people
Businesspeople from Greenwich, Connecticut
People from Roslyn, New York
Stock and commodity market managers
American stock traders
Yale University alumni
Skull and Bones Society
American chairpersons of corporations
Businesspeople from New York (state)
20th-century American businesspeople
21st-century American businesspeople
American retail chief executives
21st-century American Jews